The Central District of Mianeh County is in East Azerbaijan province, Iran. At the National Census in 2006, its population was 126,668 in 31,418 households. The following census in 2011 counted 130,079 people in 36,137 households. At the latest census in 2016, the district had 129,600 inhabitants in 39,924 households.

References 

Meyaneh County

Districts of East Azerbaijan Province

Populated places in East Azerbaijan Province

Populated places in Meyaneh County